The British Orthodox Church (BOC), formerly the Orthodox Church of the British Isles, is an independent Oriental Orthodox church.

The British Orthodox Church has not been in communion with any of the Oriental Orthodox churches since a 2015 decision to return to an independent status.

History

Origins 

The church claims to be the continuation of the Ancient British Church of Jules Ferrette.

Metropolitan Seraphim of Glastonbury has served as the metropolitan of the Metropolis of Glastonbury and Patriarch of the Orthodox Church of the British Isles, succeeding Hugh George de Willmott Newman.

Creation: merge into the Coptic Orthodox Church 
The Orthodox Church of the British Isles and the Celtic Orthodox Church split in 1994, under Mar Seraphim (William Henry Hugo Newman-Norton). For its part, the Orthodox Church of the British Isles joined the Coptic Orthodox Church and changed its name to British Orthodox Church.

On 6 April 1994, a protocol enacting the merge of the Orthodox Church of the British Isles into the Coptic Orthodox Church was signed by both parties. The Orthodox Church of the British Isles, headed by Seraphim, changed its name to British Orthodox Church for the union, and became "a diocese of the Coptic Orthodox Patriarchate of Alexandria with jurisdiction over the United Kingdom, the Republic of Ireland, the Isle of Man and the Channel Islands". The British Orthodox Church was distinct from the other communities in the British Isles of the Coptic Church. Seraphim, primate of the British Orthodox Church, was not reordained, but received a chrismation. On 19 June 1994, Seraphim "was consecrated as a Metropolitan in the Coptic Patriarchate by His Holiness Pope Shenouda assisted by some seventy Metropolitans and Bishops". Seraphim then became member of the Holy Synod of the Coptic Orthodox Church.

Independence again 
On 4 October 2015 the Coptic Orthodox Patriarchate, in response to a request from the British Orthodox Church, "in the same spirit with which this union came into being", agreed to the British Orthodox Church returning to its pre-1994 status "in fulfilment to what it sees as its current mission in the light of the developments and changing dynamics of the Middle East and Britain". The British Orthodox website spoke of it "amicably returning to its original status in order to fulfil its mission more effectively". This resulted in the British Orthodox Church returning to a non-canonical status, outside of communion with any church.

In January 2019, the BOC announced that Seraphim was once again considered as its Patriarch, since from the moment of the union with the Coptic Church Seraphim had ceased to use this title.

On 29 October 2017, Metropolitan Seraphim, acting solus, consecrated Father David Seeds as Bishop David of Priddy.

On 23 February 2019, Patriarch Seraphim, acting with Bishop David of Priddy, consecrated Father James Maskery as His Eminence Abba James, Archbishop Titular of Caerleon-upon-Usk and Mafrian of the British Orthodox Church. Mafrian is a title used in the Syrian Orthodox Church for the Catholicos of the East, and the primate of the church in the Sassanid Empire, now Iran and Iraq.

Publications
Through the church press it publishes the Glastonbury Review, the only English-language journal committed to regular reporting about the activities of the Oriental Orthodox churches and it has also begun to republish some important theological works.

Primates 

 Richard Williams Morgan (claimed)
 Charles Isaac Stevens (claimed)
 James Martin (claimed)
 Andries Caarel Albertus McLaglen (claimed)
 Herbert James Monzani-Heard (claimed)
 Hugh George de Willmott Newman
 Abba Seraphim

See also 
 Catholicate of the West

References

External links
 Official website

Oriental Orthodox church bodies
Oriental Orthodoxy in the United Kingdom
1994 establishments in the United Kingdom
Religious organizations established in 1994